Time is a 2006 British documentary television programme first broadcast on BBC Four. It is written and presented by Michio Kaku.

Episodes
 "Daytime", exploring human perception of time in day-to-day life
 "Lifetime", the effect of aging on human perception of time, and research into extending the human lifespan
 "Earth Time", how an understanding of geological time changes the human race's perception of itself
 "Cosmic Time", the current understanding of the nature of time on a cosmic scale

External links
 
  
 

2006 British television series debuts
2006 British television series endings
BBC television documentaries
Time in fiction